This is a list of films which placed number-one at the week box office in Argentina during 2003. Amounts are in American dollars.

Highest-grossing films

See also 
 List of Argentine films of 2003

References 

Argentina
2003